A list of animated television series first aired in 1981.

See also
 List of animated feature films of 1981
 List of Japanese animation television series of 1981

References

Television series
Animated series
1981
1981
1981-related lists